Petru Cazacu ( was a politician from Bessarabia (Moldova).

Biography 
He served as the prime minister of the Moldavian Democratic Republic in 1918.

Works 
 P. Cazacu, Moldova dintre Prut şi Nistru. 1812–1918, Chişinău, 1992.
 P. Cazacu, Zece ani de la Unire: Moldova dintre Prut și Nistru 1918-1928. București, Tipografia ziarului Universul,1928

External links
 Biblio Polis - Vol. 25 (2008) Nr. 1 (Serie nouă)

Notes

 

1873 births
1956 deaths
Physicians from Chișinău
People from Kishinyovsky Uyezd
Prime Ministers of Moldova
20th-century Moldovan historians
Politicians from Chișinău